The 1933 World Series was the championship series of the 1933 Major League Baseball season. The 30th edition of the World Series, it matched the National League (NL) pennant winner New York Giants and the American League (AL) pennant winner Washington Senators. The Giants defeated the Senators in five games for their first championship since  and their fourth overall. Key to the Giants' World Series triumph was the pitching of aces "King" Carl Hubbell and "Prince" Hal Schumacher.

This would be the last World Series played in Washington, D.C., until .

Background

New York Giants majority owner John McGraw retired as manager in 1932 after 30 years at the helm, naming his protégé, young star first baseman Bill Terry, recently the last .400 hitter in the National League, as his player-manager successor.  Somewhat similarly, former superstar hurler Walter Johnson also retired in 1932 as Washington Senators manager in favor of young star shortstop Joe Cronin as their new player-manager. (McGraw watched the Series from the stands, and died four months later.)

The Senators were the surprise team of 1933, breaking a seven-year monopoly on the AL title jointly held by the New York Yankees and Philadelphia Athletics from 1926 to 1932. But this could also be called a joint 13-year monopoly by all three, since the Senators had also won in 1924 and 1925 and the Yankees won from 1921 to 1923. 43-year-old future Hall of Famer Sam Rice, in his last year with the Senators, had only one at bat during the series, picking up a pinch hit single in the second game.

Summary

Matchups

Game 1

Mel Ott had four hits and three RBI in Game 1, hitting a two-run home run in the first and RBI single in the third with two on, all off of Lefty Stewart. Travis Jackson scored the Giants' last run on a groundout off of Jack Russell. Carl Hubbell struck out ten, allowed two unearned runs (on groundouts by Joe Cronin in the fourth with two on and Joe Kuhel with the bases loaded in the ninth) and pitched a five-hitter.

Game 2

The Giants overcame a 1–0 deficit (as a result of Goose Goslin's third inning home run) with a six-run sixth inning. They loaded the bases with no outs on a single, double and intentional walk off of General Crowder before Lefty O'Doul hit a pinch-hit single that scored two runs. RBI singles by Travis Jackson, Gus Mancuso, Hal Schumacher and Jo-Jo Moore each scored a run. Hal Schumacher pitched a five-hitter for a 6–1 victory, giving New York a 2–0 lead.

Game 3

The Senators scored two runs in the first inning on Joe Cronin's RBI groundout with runners on second and third followed by Fred Schulte's RBI double. Next inning, Ossie Bluege hit a leadoff double and scored on Buddy Myer's double. They got one more run in the seventh when Luke Sewell singled, stole second, moved to third on a groundout and scored on Myer's double. Earl Whitehill held New York to five hits in the shutout. To date, this is the last World Series game in which a Washington team won at home.

Game 4

Carl Hubbell went all eleven innings in the 2–1 win. He induced Cliff Bolton to ground out into a bases-loaded, game ending double play. Bill Terry's home run off of Monte Weaver put the Giants up 1–0 in the fourth, but the Senators tied the score in the seventh when Joe Kuhel reached on an error, moved to second on a sacrifice bunt and scored on Luke Sewell's single. Travis Jackson singled to lead off the 11th, moved to second on a sacrifice bunt, and scored the game winning run on Blondy Ryan's single.

Game 5

In the second, Hal Schumacher's two-run single with runners on second and third put the Giants up 2–0 off of General Crowder. Kiddo Davis hit a leadoff double in the sixth and scored on Gus Mancuso's double to extend the lead to 3–0. Fred Schulte hit a game-tying three run homer in the sixth after two, two-out singles. for the Senators. Mel Ott's second home run of the series in the tenth off of Jack Russell won the Series for New York. Dolf Luque earned the win with 4 shutout innings of relief for Schumacher.

Composite line score
1933 World Series (4–1): New York Giants (N.L.) beat Washington Senators (A.L.)

At the time, the winning margin of five runs was second-lowest for a five-game series (later equaled in 1942 and 1974); the 1915 margin was two runs, and three runs in 2000.

Aftermath
Until winning the National League pennant in 2019, Washington, D.C., had not hosted another World Series game since 1933. In 2012, the Washington Nationals, formerly the Montreal Expos, brought postseason play back to Washington for the first time in 79 years but lost the National League Division Series (NLDS) after being one strike away from eliminating the St. Louis Cardinals after their early 6–0 lead had evaporated. In 2019, the Nationals won their first postseason series since their move—the Wild Card Game, NLDS, and NLCS—as their October stints in 2014, 2016, and 2017 had all ended in NLDS losses. (While in Montreal, the franchise made only one postseason appearance, winning the 1981 NLDS that was created due to that season's players' strike, then losing the 1981 NLCS.)

The second Washington Senators, inaugurated in 1961 to replace the first edition on its way to Minnesota, became the Texas Rangers in 1972, who were also defeated four games to one in their first World Series ever by the now San Francisco Giants in 2010, with both Series 77 years apart starting in the Giants' home park and the Giants losing only Game 3 on the road in each.

Sources

References

External links

World Series
World Series
New York Giants (NL) postseason
Washington Senators (1901–1960) postseason
World Series
World Series
World Series
Baseball competitions in New York City
Baseball competitions in Washington, D.C.
1930s in Manhattan
Washington Heights, Manhattan